The 2003 Northwest Territories general election was held on November 24, 2003, to elect the 19 members of the Legislative Assembly.

The election was called on October 27. Premier Stephen Kakfwi had previously chosen not to run.

The territory operates on a consensus government system with no political parties; the premier is subsequently chosen by and from the Members of the Legislative Assembly (MLAs). There were 21,474 registered voters at the time of the election.

Issues

Issues at the election included:

devolution of federal powers, 
the method of choosing the premier, 
the alcohol abuse and suicide problems,
shortage of medical professionals and affordable housing;
school crowding,
the $85-million deficit;
sharing of profits from mining and oil and gas development.

Results 

Elections were held in 14 of the 19 electoral districts. The following five districts acclaimed their MLA:

Hay River North: Paul Delorey
Inuvik Boot Lake: Floyd Roland
Mackenzie Delta: David Krutko
Weledeh: Joe Handley
Yellowknife South: Brendan Bell

The following is a list of the districts with their winning candidates.

Results (CBC News)

Joe Handley was acclaimed premier by the legislature on December 10, 2003. His two prospective opponents, Roger Allen and Floyd Roland, had announced that they would not run against him.

Miscellaneous 

In an unusual occurrence, the riding of Inuvik Twin Lakes experienced 150% voter turnout. 356 people were registered to vote in that riding, but an additional 187 showed up at the ballot box. A resident of a riding eligible but not registered to vote may register on the spot by presenting a proof of residency.

External links 
Elections NWT
CBC: Northwest Territories Votes 2003
NWT Legislative Assembly
NWT Legislative Assembly - About Consensus Government

Northwest Territories general
Elections in the Northwest Territories
November 2003 events in Canada
2003 in the Northwest Territories